Ore Mukham is a 2016 Indian Malayalam-language mystery film directed by Sajith Jagadnandan and written by Deepu  and Sandeep Sadanandan. It stars Dhyan Sreenivasan in lead role. The film told in a non-linear style, is set in two periods. One period, set in the 1980s, tells the college life of the main protagonists. The other, set in the present day, describes the investigation into a series of murders involving the protagonists. Ore Mukham was released on 2 December 2016.

Plot 
Zachariah Pothen (Dhyan Sreenivasan) is a rich orphan and a bully who chases after girls in their campus with his friends Das (Aju Varghese), Devan (Yazir Saleem), Prakashan (Deepak Parambol) and Aravindan (Arjun Nandhakumar). However, the power dynamics in their group often fluctuate and create discomfort, leading to treachery that ends up taking lives. Years later the same group is haunted by serial killing and the police are trying to unravel the mystery. Circumstances point police to suspect Zacharia, who was the prime accused for murdering Devan and Gayathri (Gayathri Suresh) on the day of their marriage long ago, and has been missing since then. The movie further reveals Prakashan and Aravidan murdered both Devan and Gayathri as a part of their treacherous plan. Zachariah too is killed by them and they hide his body to pin the other murders on him. Das was a witness; 20 years later he has started the killing spree out of revenge.

Cast 

 Dhyan Sreenivasan as Zachariah Pothen
 Chemban Vinod Jose as ACP Ashoka Chandran
 Jewel Mary as Amala
 Yazir Saleem as Devan
 Gayathri Suresh as Gayathri
 Sneha (Older) and Prayaga Martin (Younger) as Bhama  
 Maniyanpilla Raju (Older) and Aju Varghese (Younger) as Ayyappadas
 Devan (Older) and Arjun Nandhakumar (Younger) as Aravindan
 Renji Panicker (Older) and Deepak Parambol (Younger) as Prakashan
 Hareesh Peradi as Madhavan
 Abirami as Prof. Latha
 Sreejith Ravi (Older) and Unni Karthikeyan (Younger) as Varghese, Physical Education Teacher
 M. A. Nishad (Older) and Juby Ninan (Younger)  as Jacob Stephen
 Devi Ajith (Older) and Kavya Suresh (Younger) as Mary
 Neena Kurup (Older) and Orma Bose (Younger) as  Rema
 Roshni as Annakutty
 Pradeep Kottayam as Librarian
 Roy as Jeevan
 Remya Panicker as Shalini
 Noby Marcose as Shasi
 Sneha Sreekumar as Thankam Shasi

Production
Ore Mukham is Sajith Jagadnandan's second movie and first screenplay of Deepu S Nair and Sandeep Sadanandan. Photography took place in Sree Kerala Varma College, Thrissur from April 2016. The film was released on 2 December 2016.

Casting 
Dhyan Sreenivasan signed on to play the male lead along with Aju Varghese, Deepak Parambol and Arjun Nandakumar in the supporting roles. Prayaga Martin who played the lead lady in Oru Murai Vanth Parthya and Gayathri Suresh who made her debut in Jamna Pyari signed on to play the female leads. Renji Panicker and Chemban Vinod Jose are also part of the cast. Amala Paul signed on to play a significant role in the movie. However, she was replaced by anchor-turned-actress Jewel Mary in the movie after the former opted out due to date issues as the shoot of Shajahanum Pareekuttiyum was extended due to unexpected rains.
In May 2016, actress Abhirami signed on to play the role of a lecturer who inspires Zacharia.

Soundtrack
Music: Bijibal

Lyrics: Rafeeq Ahamed, Lalji Kattiparamban

References

External links
 

2010s Malayalam-language films
2016 films
Indian mystery films
Films shot in Thrissur